USS Menifee (APA-202) was a  that saw service with the US Navy in World War II and the Korean War.

Menifee was laid down as MCV Hull No. 670 by Kaiser Shipbuilding of Vancouver, Washington on 21 July 1944; launched 15 October 1944, and commissioned 4 November 1944.

Operational history

World War II
Menifee reported to ComPhibsTraPac for intensive amphibious training 8 December 1944 and within a month was underway for Hawaii with US Navy and Marine personnel and cargo. Unloading her initial cargo and passengers at Honolulu 15 January 1945, she departed for the South Pacific on the 27th. On 5 February, she arrived at Guadalcanal for further training exercises in preparation for the Okinawa campaign.

Invasion of Okinawa

On 1 April, Menifee arrived in the transport area off Okinawa with cargo and units of the 6th Marine Division on board. Remaining in the area through the 4th, she landed her troops during the first 2 days and discharged her cargo on the 3d and 4th. On the 5th, she got underway for the United States, arriving at San Francisco 11 May to take on Army personnel and cargo bound for the Philippines.

By 19 June, Menifee had discharged her passengers and cargo at Leyte and was underway for a quick cargo run to Milne Bay, New Guinea. Upon her return from the Netherlands East Indies, she headed back to California, arriving San Pedro 2 August.

After hostilities

After the cessation of hostilities in the Pacific, Menifee continued ferrying occupation troops to Japan and war-weary veterans back to the United States. Released from Magic Carpet duty in early 1946, she reported to the 19th Fleet 9 March and upon decommissioning 31 July, was berthed at Stockton.

Korean War
With the outbreak of hostilities in Korea, Menifee was retrieved from the "mothball fleet" and recommissioned 2 December 1950. Assigned once more to the Amphibious Force, Pacific Fleet, she completed two extended tours of duty in the western Pacific before inactivating a second time in 1955. From April 1951 to March 1952, Menifee ferried troops between Japan and Korea and within Korean waters, insuring through her mobility, the distribution of U.N. forces according to need. During her second WestPac deployment, August 1953 to April 1954, she took part in extensive amphibious training exercises with American and Korean Marines and served as flagship for Operation "Big Lift", the transfer of neutral Indian troops to the peace conference in Panmunjom.

Decommissioning
On 29 June 1955, Menifee was placed out of commission in reserve, assigned to the San Francisco Group, Pacific Reserve Fleet. She was struck from the Navy Vessel Register 1 October and transferred to the Maritime Commission. In 1969, she was berthed at Suisun Bay in the National Defense Reserve Fleet. She was sold for scrapping on 28 May 1975.

Decorations
Menifee received one battle star for World War II service and two for Korean service.

References

Menifee (APA-202), DANFS Online
APA-202 Menifee, Navsource Online

 

Haskell-class attack transports
Menifee County, Kentucky
World War II amphibious warfare vessels of the United States
Troop ships
Ships built in Vancouver, Washington
1944 ships